The Western pattern diet is a modern dietary pattern that is generally characterized by high intakes of pre-packaged foods, refined grains, red meat, processed meat, high-sugar drinks, candy and sweets, fried foods, conventionally-raised animal products, butter and other high-fat dairy products, eggs,  potatoes, corn (and high-fructose corn syrup), and low intakes of fruits, vegetables, whole grains, pasture-raised animal products, fish, nuts, and seeds.

Dietary pattern analysis focuses on overall diets (such as the Mediterranean diet) rather than individual foods or nutrients. Compared to the "prudent pattern diet", which has higher proportions of "fruit, vegetables, whole grains, and poultry", the Western pattern diet is associated with higher risks of cardiovascular disease and obesity.

Elements

This diet is "rich in red meat, dairy products, processed and artificially sweetened foods, and salt, with minimal intake of fruits, vegetables, fish, legumes, and whole grains." Various foods and food processing procedures that had been introduced during the Neolithic and Industrial Periods had fundamentally altered 7 nutritional characteristics of ancestral hominin diets: glycemic load, fatty acid composition, macronutrient composition, micronutrient density, acid-base balance, sodium-potassium ratio, and fiber content.

In 2006 the typical American diet was about 2,200 calories per day, with 50% of calories from carbohydrates, 15% protein, and 35% fat. These macronutrient intakes fall within the Acceptable Macronutrient Distribution Ranges (AMDR) for adults identified by the Food and Nutrition Board of the United States Institute of Medicine as "associated with reduced risk of chronic diseases while providing adequate intakes of essential nutrients," which are 45–65% carbohydrate, 10–35% protein, and 20–35% fat as a percentage of total energy. However, the nutritional quality of the specific foods comprising those macronutrients is often poor, as with the "Western" pattern discussed above. Complex carbohydrates such as starch are believed to be more healthy than sugar, which is frequently consumed in the Standard American Diet.

The energy-density of a typical WPD has continuously increased over time. USDA research conducted in the mid twenty-tens suggests that the average intake of American adults is at least 2,390 kcal per day. Researchers that used different data collection/analysis methods have predicted that the average was about 3,680 kcal per day. By contrast, a healthy daily intake is much lower. Since American adults usually have sedentary lifestyles guidelines suggest 1,600–2,000 kcal is appropriate for most women and 2,000–2,600 kcal is appropriate for men with the same PAL.

A review of eating habits in the United States in 2004 found that about 75% of restaurant meals were from fast-food restaurants. Nearly half of the meals ordered from a menu were hamburger, French fries, or poultry — and about one third of orders included a carbonated beverage drink. From 1970 to 2008, the per capita consumption of calories increased by nearly one-quarter in the United States and about 10% of all calories were from high-fructose corn syrup.

Americans consume more than 13% of their daily calories in the form of added sugars. Beverages such as flavored water, soft drinks, and sweetened caffeinated beverages make up 47% of these added sugars.

Americans ages 1 and above consume significantly more added sugars, oils, saturated fats, and sodium than recommended in the Dietary Guidelines outlined by the Office of Disease Prevention and Health Promotion. 89% of Americans consume more sodium than recommended. Additionally, excessive consumption of oils, saturated fats, and added sugars is seen in 72%, 71%, and 70% of the American population, respectively.

Consumers began turning to margarine due to concerns over the high levels of saturated fats found in butter. By 1958, margarine had become more commonly consumed than butter, with the average American consuming 8.9 pounds of margarine per year. Margarine is produced by refining vegetable oils, a process that introduces trans elaidic acid not found naturally in food. The consumption of trans fatty acids such as trans elaidic acid has been linked to cardiovascular disease. By 2005, margarine consumption had fallen below butter consumption due to the risks associated with trans fat intake.

Vegetable consumption is low among Americans, with only 13% of the population consuming the recommended amounts. Boys ages 9 to 13 and girls ages 14 to 18 consume the lowest amounts of vegetables relative to the general population. Potatoes and tomatoes, which are key components of many meals, account for 39% of the vegetables consumed by Americans. 60% of vegetables are consumed individually, 30% are included as part of a dish, and 10% are found in sauces.

Whole grains should consist of over half of total grain consumption, and refined grains should not exceed half of total grain consumption. However, 85.3% of the cereals eaten by Americans are produced with refined grains, where the germ and bran are removed. Grain refining increases shelf life and softens breads and pastries; however, the process of refining decreases its nutritional quality.

Health concerns
Based on preliminary epidemiological studies, compared to a healthy diet, the Western pattern diet is positively correlated with an elevated incidence of obesity, death from heart disease, cancer (especially colon cancer), and other "Western pattern diet"-related diseases. It increases the risk of the metabolic syndrome and may have a negative impact on cardio-metabolic health.

Crohn's disease 
A Western pattern diet has been associated with Crohn's disease. Crohn's disease has its effects on the symbiotic bacteria within the human gut that show a positive correlation with a Western pattern diet. Symptoms can range from abdominal pain to diarrhea and fever.

Obesity 

A Western pattern diet is associated with an increased risk of obesity. There is a positive correlation between a Western pattern diet and several plasma biomarkers that may be mediators of obesity, such as HDL cholesterol, high levels of fasting insulin, and leptin. Meta-analyses have also shown that, compared to a healthy diet, a Western pattern diet is linked to increased weight gain among females and  adolescents.

Diabetes 
Several studies have shown that there is a positive correlation between adoption of a Western pattern diet and incidence of type 2 diabetes among both men and women.

Cancer 
The Western pattern diet has been generally linked to increased risk for colorectal cancer. Meta-analyses have found that diet patterns consistent with those of the Western pattern diet are positively correlated with risk for prostate cancer.  Greater adherence to a Western pattern diet was also found to increase the overall risk of mortality due to cancer.

No significant relation has been established between the Western pattern diet and breast cancer.

Prevalence
The western-versus-eastern dichotomy has become less relevant as such a diet is no longer "foreign" to any global region (just as traditional East Asian cuisine is no longer "foreign" to the west), but the term is still a well-understood shorthand in medical literature, regardless of where the diet is found. Other dietary patterns described in the medical research include "drinker" and "meat-eater" patterns.  Because of the variability in diets, individuals are usually classified not as simply "following" or "not following" a given diet, but instead by ranking them according to how closely their diets line up with each pattern in turn. The researchers then compare the outcomes between the group that most closely follows a given pattern to the group that least closely follows a given pattern.

History

The Western diet present in today's world is a consequence of the Neolithic revolution and Industrial revolutions. The Neolithic revolution introduced the staple foods of the western diet, including domesticated meats, sugar, alcohol, salt, cereal grains, and dairy products. The modern Western diet emerged after the Industrial Revolution, which introduced new methods of food processing including the addition of cereals, refined sugars, and refined vegetable oils to the Western diet, and also increased the fat content of domesticated meats.  More recently, food processors began replacing sugar with high-fructose corn syrup.

See also 

 European cuisine
 Fast food
 Healthy diet
 Junk food
 List of diets
 Mediterranean diet
 Metabolic syndrome
 Nutritional gatekeeper

References

Further reading 
 .  About the changes in dietary advice and eating patterns between 1880 and 1930.

Diets
Western cuisine